Sarah Haskins may refer to:

 Sarah Haskins (triathlete) (born 1981), American triathlete
 Sarah Haskins (comedian) (born 1979), InfoMania comedian